Kendrick Johnson (born June 3, 1975) is a former American professional basketball player who played college basketball for Point Loma.

Career 
Johnson averaged 21.6 points, 5.2 rebounds and 4.5 assists per game while connecting on 47.8 percent from the field for the Sydney Kings in the 2000-01 season. He made his NBL debut for the Kings in late December 2000, his last game for the Kings came on March 11, 2001. During his Sydney stint, Johnson had a dunking which was later named "one of the best NBL jams of all-time".

In 2002-03, Johnson was the leading scorer of İstanbul Teknik Üniversitesi B.K. in the Turkish league, averaging 22.1 points a game. Playing for Union Baskets Schwelm in Germany's Basketball Bundesliga in 2005, Johnson scored 22.9 points per game through seven contests, including a 40-point-performance, setting the league's season high for most points in a single game.

References

1975 births
Living people
American expatriate basketball people in North Macedonia
APOEL B.C. players
Guards (basketball)
Irakleio B.C. players
Kolossos Rodou B.C. players
Milon B.C. players
American men's basketball players